Redcar Lifeboat Station is a Royal National Lifeboat Institution (RNLI) lifeboat station based in the town of Redcar in North Yorkshire, England. The station is the furthest north in Yorkshire.

Redcar operates two Inshore Lifeboats (ILB); the Leicester Challenge III and the Eileen May Loach-Thomas.

History
A lifeboat, operated by local fisherman, first operated from the town in 1802. It was constructed by Henry Greathead, and at the time Redcar was just a small fishing hamlet consisting of two rows of terraced houses. The lifeboat was named Zetland and served the area and the Teesbay Lifeboat and Shipwreck Society until 1859 when the RNLI took over. Under the auspices of the RNLI, it served for six more years before being damaged and scheduled to be broken up. However, the local population arranged for the boat to be kept, which the RNLI agreed to on condition that it not be used in competition with their replacement boat, Crossley. The Crossley itself only lasted three years on the station; its self-righting buoyancy airboxes made the lifeboat too small and so the Burton-on-Trent was brought to the station in 1867.

In the early days of the lifeboat station, before it was taken over by the RNLI, a drummer boy would alert the lifeboat crew to a launch by playing Come Along, Brave Boys, Come Along. The lifeboat station itself was supplied by Lord Zetland, and the modern day (1970s) lifeboat station is located on this site too.

A former lifeboat house was built in 1877 to house the lifeboat Emma and is now grade II listed. In 1936 the RNLI purchased the building and it is now the lifeboat museum and houses Zetland, the world's oldest surviving lifeboat. Emma was named after Emma Dawson and was a gift to the townspeople by local benefactors, but Emma and her lifeboat station were completely outwith the responsibilities of the RNLI, being purely a local concern with money and support also being provided by the Order of Free Gardeners. 

In 1910, the RNLI built a new lifeboat house on the promenade to house their boat (Fifi and Charles), the Emma having fallen into disrepair a decade earlier. This building was in turn demolished in the early 1970s after a new lifeboat station was constructed nextdoor. In 1970, the County Borough of Teesside Council built a new lifeboat station for the RNLI on the seafront at Redcar. In 2014 the exterior of the lifeboat station was refurbished.

Notable incidents

 7 September 1826 - A whaling ship, the Esk, returning to her home port of Whitby, was stranded on the rocks just outside Marske-by-the-Sea. The Redcar Lifeboat attended the wreck, but only three out of a crew of twenty-nine were saved.
 25 December 1836 - The Zetland was launched on Christmas Day to help a Dutch collier (Caroline) as she was foundering in heavy seas. One of the crew members was washed overboard whilst trying to throw a line to one of the Caroline's lifeboats. Neither the crewman nor the ten crew of the collier Caroline survived. The death of the lifeboat crewman remains the only death of a crewmember to have occurred at Redcar Lifeboat Station (though other deaths associated with launching have occurred [see below]).

 29 October 1880 - The Zetland was brought out of retirement to rescue the crew of the brig, Luna, after all other lifeboats were out of action due to having also rescued stricken crews on the same day. Zetland rescued the seven men from the Luna.

 18–22 October 1898 - The Finnish Barque, Birger. The Birger had been sailing from Barcelona to Finland carrying a consignment of salt. When she was approaching the coast of Norway, a fierce storm struck the North Sea which was to last five days. The south-easterly winds blew her towards Britain and her captain tried to make port first at Grimsby, but when this proved difficult, a decision was made to head for Newcastle. Each time the stricken vessel passed by without being able to make port. By the time of her arrival in Redcar (22 October), she was struggling against the storm and taking on significant amounts of water. She was wrecked on the rocks outside of Redcar and both lifeboats, Brothers and Emma, were launched to help rescue the men. The lifeboat crews could not find anybody and the Birger's sails collapsed into the boat. Three men made it to the pier at Coatham, and of those only one survived the waves and was hauled up onto the pier by the locals who had been watching the rescue. Another man was washed ashore; 13 other sailors drowned. The wreck of the ship then cut Coatham Pier in half.

27 December 1906 - The Japanese liner Awa Maru became stuck on a reef outside Redcar (known as Westcar). The lifeboat Brothers was launched and had a successful initial rescue, but on a second try, the lifeboat had its back broken on the rocks. Despite this, they tried again only for the lifeboat's carriage to become embedded in the soft sand. The remainder of the crew of the Awa Maru managed to get ashore in their own lifeboats later. The ship had to be blasted away from the rocks, but she was successfully re-floated.

 21 January 1921 - The Redcar Lifeboat Fifi and Charles was sent out to effect a rescue of a Greek collier ship (Aphrodite) that had run aground just to the east of Redcar. Usually, the lifeboat was launched by horses but none were available, so a contingent of humans (mostly women) wheeled the boat down to the shoreline. One of the women undertaking this was crushed to death under the wheels of the trailer carrying the boat. This led to the construction of a slipway onto the beach opposite the lifeboathouse.

Fleet

Notes

References

Sources

External links

Lifeboat stations in Yorkshire
Buildings and structures in North Yorkshire
Redcar